Dia is a 2020 Indian Kannada-language romantic drama film written and directed by K S Ashoka, and produced by D Krishna Chaitanya under Sri Swarnalatha Productions. The film stars Kushee Ravi, Pruthvi Ambaar and Dheekshith Shetty, with a music score by B. Ajaneesh Loknath. It was released in India on 7 February 2020. The film was remade in  Telugu as Dear Megha (2021). The director remade the movie in Hindi as Dear Dia with Pruthvi reprising his role. The director also remade the movie in Marathi with Pruthvi again reprising his role.

Plot
Dia Swaroop, a biotechnology student, is an introvert girl living in Bengaluru. She develops a crush on her senior Rohit, but due to her introversion fails to express her feelings before he moves out of the country. Dismayed, she goes about her routine life. After three years, Dia encounters Rohit again in Mumbai where she has moved and is working. Unable to overcome her introversion again, she fails to talk to him. However, Rohit talks to her, and they both gradually develop a bond. Rohit reveals that she was his crush and proposes his love for her. She confesses and accepts him. One night as they were returning from a movie, they are met with an accident. As Dia wakes up in the hospital and asks for Rohit, she is told by her uncle that Rohit died. Unable to accept Rohit's death, Dia goes into severe depression and decides to kill herself at the railway crossings. As she stands waiting for the oncoming train, she is interrupted by a phone call from a Good Samaritan, Adi, who had retrieved Dia's bag from a thief, which she was not even aware of. Miffed at the interruption, she tells him to keep it and not call her again. Coincidentally, Adi and Dia keep bumping into each other, and Dia reveals her past to him. With his happy-go-lucky nature and charm, Adi manages to bring Dia out of her turmoil and develops a friendship with her. Soon, they realize how much they like being with each other and confess their love. Dia returns happily to Mumbai, where she is shocked to find Rohit waiting for her. It is revealed that Rohit was declared brain dead with no certainty of him returning; hence, her father lied to Dia so that she will move on. Miserable, she calls Adi and tells him. Adi, although heartbroken, tells Dia to live happily with Rohit. Adi gets to know of Dia's reception and goes to see her for one last time despite his mother forbidding him. He meets a disheartened Dia and happy Rohit and wishes them well and returns home. There, he finds that his mother died due to a massive cardiac arrest and that she could have been saved if someone was around her. Meanwhile, Dia confesses everything to Rohit, and a distressed Rohit tells her to go back to Adi so that she will be happy. Elated, Dia goes to Adi's home and finds him missing. She searches for him everywhere until an auto driver reveals that Adi has gone to the same place she went to commit suicide. Adi, feeling immense guilt over his mother's death and feeling unable to live without his mother and Dia, has decided to commit suicide at the railway crossings. He prays to God one last time for the happiness of Dia and waits for the train. Dia frantically reaches him on time and calls him out. Adi turns to her surprised and awestruck that he forgets to move and gets hit by the train as a startled Dia watches on.

Cast
 Kushee Ravi as Dia Swaroop "Soup"
 Pruthvi Ambaar as Adi
 Dheekshith Shetty as Rohit
 Pavithra Lokesh as Dr. Lakshmi "Lucky", Adi's mother
 Arvind Rao as Dia's father 
 Rajesh Rao as Dia's father's friend
 Jyothi Rai  as Rohit's sister
 Chandan Ravandur N as passenger in a train
 Gokul Chakravarthy as Auto Driver
 Rakesh Srinivas as Auto Driver
 Darshan Apoorva as Rohit's friend
 Rudwin as Rohit's friend

Production
Dia is KS Ashoka's second feature film which comes seven years after his successful debut with the horror film 6-5=2. The story is centered on the external and internal experiences and dialogues of the female protagonist. Ashoka decided to use an instrumental score with no songs in similarity to European romance films. The film has been shot in Bangalore, Karwar, Kudremukh and Mumbai.

Music 

B. Ajaneesh Loknath composed the music score which has no songs in the film but had one promotional song, "Soul of Dia".

Home media 
The film was made available to stream on OTT platform Amazon Prime on 8 March 2020, while its satellite rights were acquired by Zee Kannada.

Reception
Reviewing Dia for The Times of India, Sunayana Suresh gave four stars from five, praising the realism of the story, the three main performances, the cinematography, and the music score. Suresh concluded: " ... the film is for those who want to experience cinema in a brave new style sans the commercial staples ... ". In his review for The Hindu, S.Shiva Kumar praised the direction, acting, writing and music score while criticizing the conclusion as too abrupt. Kumar commented: " ... The acting is first-rate particularly Kushee and Pruvthvi. Pavithra Lokesh is all grace and poise in a beautifully written role ...". In the Deccan Herald, Vivek MV praised the direction, music score, and the performances of Shetty and Ambar while criticizing both the plot as largely predictable and the performance of Kushee. Asianet News praised the performance of Kushee and the screenplay apart from the slow beginning. For the New Indian Express, A.Sharadhaa gave four stars from five with praise for the screenplay, direction, performances, music and cinematography. Sharadhaa commented: " ... With a skillfully told love story - one that is not generic - the director creates a unique kind of euphoria with heartbreaks ...".

Accolades

Notes

References

External links

2020 films
Films set in Karnataka
2020s Kannada-language films
Films shot in Karnataka
2020 romantic drama films
Indian romantic drama films
Kannada films remade in other languages
Films directed by K. S. Ashoka